Prostanthera tysoniana is a species of flowering plant in the family Lamiaceae and is endemic to Western Australia. It is a small, intricately-branched shrub with broadly elliptic  leaves arranged in opposite pairs and white or cream-coloured flowers with purple streaks.

Description
Flowering occurs in September.

Taxonomy
This mintbush was first formally described in 1997 by John Carrick who gave it the name Eichlerago tysoniana in the Journal of the Adelaide Botanic Gardens, from specimens collected by Isaac Tyson near the Murchison River in 1898.<ref name=APNI1>{{cite web|title='Eichlerago tysoniana|url= https://id.biodiversity.org.au/instance/apni/482922 |publisher=APNI|access-date=6 October 2020}}</ref> In 1992, Barry Conn changed the name to Prostanthera tysoniana in the journal Telopea.

Distribution and habitatProstanthera tysoniana is a rare species, only known from the Byro-Mount Narryer area in the Murchison biogeographic region.

Conservation statusProstanthera tysoniana'' is classified as "Priority Three" by the Government of Western Australia Department of Parks and Wildlife meaning that it is poorly known and known from only a few locations but is not under imminent threat.

References

tysoniana
Flora of Western Australia
Lamiales of Australia
Plants described in 1977